Ahimsa silk (ahiṃsā: Sanskrit for 'nonviolence') is a method of nonviolent silk breeding and harvesting. Wild silk moths are bred, rather than the domestic variety. It allows the completion of the metamorphosis of the silkworm to its moth stage, whereas most silk harvesting requires the silkworms to be killed in their cocoon stage. No animals suffer or die for the silk to be produced, making it a favorable alternative to normal silk for those who object to harming animals.

Process

The pupa is allowed to hatch and the leftover cocoon is then used to create silk.

While the Bombyx mori (also called mulberry silkworm or mulberry silk moth) are the preferred species for creating ahimsa silk, there are a few other types of species that fall under the category of ahimsa silk, which is defined not necessarily by the species of the moth involved but by the methods for harvesting the cocoon. The other types of silkworm that are used for this process are a subspecies of the ailanthus silkmoth and several types of tussah or Tasar moths: the Chinese tussah moth, the Indian Tasar moth, and the muga moth.

The subspecies of the ailanthus silkmoth, Samia cynthia ricini, eat the leaves of the castor bean or cassava leaves. It is also known as the eri silkmoth. Eri silk is made from the cocoons of these particular insects and is also produced using less violent methods than the normal heat treating, but the quality of Eri silk is often seen as inferior to that of the silk created by the offspring of the Bombyx mori moth.

Qualities

The main qualities of ahimsa silk are derived from the ideals surrounding the concept of non-violence. This allows the silk to be manufactured without harm to the beings that created it. These ideals appeal to religions like Jainism, Hinduism and Buddhism whose followers forego all injury to other forms of life. Non-violent lifestyle proponents have more recently found peace silk to be in keeping with their way of life.

From a short-run economic standpoint, it is difficult to make the argument for peace silk as it requires 10 extra days in the process to let the larvae grow and the moths to hatch out of the cocoons. In contrast, the less humane process takes about 15 minutes. At this later stage the cocoon yields one-sixth of the filament. This inflates the cost of nonviolent silk, which is priced at roughly 6,000 rupees (US$92) per kilogram—about twice the price of the regular kind.

See also
 Kausheya, an ancient Indian wild silk.
 Eri silk
 Samia cynthia
 Is Peace Silk ethical?

References

Silk in India